Norman Bradley Joseph (born December 28, 1954) is an American football coach and former player.  He was the head football coach at Mississippi College in Clinton, Mississippi from 2005 to 2013.  Joseph served as the head football coach at Belhaven College from 1998 to 2000 and at Louisiana College in 2004.

Playing career
Born in Vicksburg, Mississippi, Joseph played college football at Mississippi State University and earned Churchman All-American honors in 1976.  Joseph earned his B.S. in speech education from Mississippi State in 1977 and Master of Education Degree while coaching at Northeast Louisiana University in 1979.

Coaching career

Assistant coaching
Joseph has coached as an assistant at Northeast Louisiana, Louisiana Tech, Northwestern State University, Southern Mississippi, San Jose State University and Midwestern State University  He enjoyed much success as an assistant coach, including turning San Jose State into one of the best offensive teams at the collegiate level.

Belhaven
Joseph was the first head football coach for the Belhaven College Blazers located in Jackson, Mississippi and he held that position for three seasons, from 1998 until 2000. During his three seasons there, the Blazers were 4-6 in 1998, and 7-4 in 1999 and 2000 (16-16 overall).

At Belhaven, Joseph became the only coach in the NAIA in history to produce both a 1,000 yard rusher and 1,000 yard receiver in a program's first two seasons of existence.  His successful start of the football program helped him to lead Belhaven to a top 25 National ranking for six consecutive weeks in only the school's second season of play.  Belhaven began its season with a 6-1 record, but lost the final three games of its season to finish 7-4.

Louisiana College
Louisiana College in Pineville, Louisiana selected Joseph as head coach to replace Marty Secord for the 2004 season. The team went 5-5.

Mississippi College
After one year at Louisiana, Joseph became the head coach at Mississippi College in Clinton, Mississippi beginning in the 2005 season, when the Choctaws went 2-8.  The Choctaws finished 5-5 and 8-2 in 2006 and 2007, respectively. His 2008 squad began the season ranked #25 in the NCAA's Division III, but fell from the polls after an opening week, 42–6 defeat at the hands of rival Millsaps and finished the year 5-5. In 2009, the Choctaws finished 9-3 and reached the Division III playoffs. After 4 consecutive losing seasons, Joseph stepped down as the Choctaws head coach in 2013, prior to MC's move to Division II.

Head coaching record

References

External links
 Mississippi College profile

1954 births
Living people
Belhaven Blazers football coaches
Louisiana Christian Wildcats football coaches
Louisiana Tech Bulldogs football coaches
Louisiana–Monroe Warhawks football coaches
Midwestern State Mustangs football coaches
Mississippi College Choctaws football coaches
Mississippi State Bulldogs football players
Northwestern State Demons football coaches
Sportspeople from Vicksburg, Mississippi
San Jose State Spartans football coaches
Southern Miss Golden Eagles football coaches
University of Louisiana at Monroe alumni